Malaryta District is an administrative subdivision, a raion of Brest Region, in Belarus. Its administrative center is Malaryta.

Demographics
According to Belarus Census (2009), Malaryta Raion had a population of 25,780;  88.3% identified themselves as Belarusian, 7.2% as Ukrainian and 3.7% as Russian; 56.6% spoke Belarusian and 38.1% Russian as their native language.

References

 
Districts of Brest Region